The L. Ron Hubbard Residence is a historic Shingle style house located at 666 East Avenue in the borough of Bay Head in Ocean County, New Jersey, United States. Built , it was added to the National Register of Historic Places on May 17, 2018, for its significance in literature, philosophy, and religion with respect to the work of L. Ron Hubbard. The house had previously been listed as a contributing property of the Bay Head Historic District in 2006.

History and description
The house is a two and one-half story frame building constructed  and located near the Atlantic Ocean. It combines American Foursquare and Shingle style architecture. American author Lafayette Ronald (L. Ron) Hubbard (1911–1986) lived here from September 1949 to June 1950. During this time, he wrote Dianetics: The Modern Science of Mental Health (1950), which became the basis of Scientology.

See also
National Register of Historic Places listings in Ocean County, New Jersey
L. Ron Hubbard House – house in Washington, D.C.

References

External links
 

Bay Head, New Jersey
L. Ron Hubbard
Scientology properties
National Register of Historic Places in Ocean County, New Jersey
Houses on the National Register of Historic Places in New Jersey
Individually listed contributing properties to historic districts on the National Register in New Jersey
Houses in Ocean County, New Jersey
American Foursquare architecture
Shingle Style architecture in New Jersey
Houses completed in 1910
1910 establishments in New Jersey
New Jersey Register of Historic Places